Julian Cheung Chi-lam (born 27 August 1971), better known by his stage name Chilam, is a Hong Kong singer and actor. Cheung is popularly known for his role as Guo Jing in the 1994 TV series adaptation of the Wuxia novel, The Legend of the Condor Heroes, and also as Chi-Kin from the TVB drama Cold Blood Warm Heart (1996).

Cheung hit instant fame in 1991 with the release of his first single, "A Modern Love Story" with Maple Hui and has since been the only artist that has sold the most copies for a debut album under IFPI. In 1992, Cheung received a TVB Jade Solid Gold award as Best Newcoming Singer (Bronze) for his first album. In 2000, Cheung reap 2 notable awards from TVB for the drama, Return of the Cuckoo.

Cheung has earned 60 million HKD in 2014.

Early life
Born in Hong Kong on 27 August 1971, Cheung spent most of his early years in Hong Kong attending all-male Catholic primary school. He later went to a Protestant secondary school. He has an elder sister and a younger sister. When he was 13, his parents divorced and he and his father emigrated to Australia when he was 15. He attended Pendle Hill High School in Sydney. In 1986, his parents remarried but later divorced a second time. He was a good actor and singer and his father thought he had a gift and sent him to an acting school.

Career
In 1990 when Cheung was 19, Cheung visited Hong Kong during his summer vacation and was reacquainted with his cousin and childhood friend, Anna Ueyama (上山安娜). Anna introduced Cheung to his first manager, Tony. Impressed with Cheung's voice, Tony immediately signed him into IFPI and started to train him. Cheung then recorded his first song, a duet album with Hong Kong singer Maple Hui (許秋怡). The debut single, "A Modern Love Story", was released by the record company Fitto in 1991 and was an immense success. This single was on IFPI Album Sales Chart for 11 weeks, and as of today still holds the IFPI record for newcomer singers.

That same year, Cheung signed into TVB and starred in his first television series, Peak of Passion, released in 1992. A year later, he filmed his very first movie, A Warrior's Tragedy. Cheung reached to the peak of his popularity in 1994 when he took part as the role of Guo Jing from The Legend of the Condor Heroes, which helped him to become one of the most favourite actors at that time. In 1996, he starred in the TVB classic hit drama Cold Blood Warm Heart, which acclaimed him notable praises of his performance, making him a household name and boosted his career in the Hong Kong entertainment industry.

After the release of Cold Blood Warm Heart, he transitioned into movies such as Perfect Match and Comic King. He returned to TVB in 2000 in the series Return of the Cuckoo, which was a tremendous success with Charmaine Sheh, reaching a peak of 40 points. His status and recognition as an actor dramatically increased to countries such as Singapore, Malaysia, Vietnam, Thailand, Taiwan and China. He also reaped 2 awards in the TVB award ceremony (My Favorite Couple-with Charmaine Sheh and My Favorite Themesong), adding to his string of wins. in 2003, he won My Favorite Leading Character again for his role as Yeung Kwong from Take My Word For It. His performance with Charmaine Sheh in the 2004 drama Point of No Return also won the pair the Best Onscreen Couple award at the 2005 Astro Awards in Malaysia. Cheung has also found success in the Mainland entertainment industry with starring roles in the television series Ni Shui Han, Lu Xiao Feng, and Red Powder.

In 2012, he returned to TVB to film sequel to TVB's 2003 blockbuster television drama Triumph in the Skies. His role as Captain Koo has boosted his popularity once again and earned him a spot in the peoples' hearts.

Music
His first concert at Hong Kong Coliseum was held on 27 March 2011 which the title for the concert was I Am An Alien. On 6 July 2014, he had his second concert at Hong Kong Coliseum on four-sided stage, called Crazy Hours.

In 2021, he joined the cast of reality tv show Call Me By Fire as a contestant.

Personal life
Julian is married to Hong Kong actress Anita Yuen. They have a son together, born in 2006. Their relationship started back in the 1990s where they met each other in the Hong Kong entertainment business in a music video they did together and during that time, they were at the height of their Hong Kong entertainment careers and eventually by 1994, they publicly announced their relationship. They secretly wedded in 2001 in San Francisco, California. Anita said in 2021 that  they tried to have another child, but all efforts failed including in vitro fertilisation.

Discography 
He has recorded albums in both Cantonese and Mandarin. He has been with various record labels, such as Fitto Entertainment, Sony Music, EMI (Cantonese albums only), Rock Records (Mandarin albums only), Cinepoly Records (subsidiary of Universal Music Hong Kong), Starj & Snazz and Neway Star.

 Modern Love Story (November 1991) (duet album with Maple Hui)
Note: The album was later re-released under the EMI label and later, Warner Music.
 Make Me Happy (October 1992)
 Miss You Much (September 1993)
 CHILAM (October 1994)
 Love at Creation Times(November 1994)
 Love Played A Joke on Us (1995)
 Thanks For Your Concern (June 1995)
 Cold Blood Warm Heart Compilation (March 1996)
 Insincere (1996)
 Smile With Tears Single (1996)
 I Love You Too (March 1997)
 Best of the Best 22 Songs (1997)
 Black Temptation (November 1997)
 Yes or No (1998)
 Monsieur Enfant EP (1999)
 Chi Lam Love Collection (1999) 
 Tian Di Nan Er (1999)
 Moonlight / Return of the Cuckoo Original Soundtrack (2000)
 Ten Fingers Interlocked (2000)
 Ten Fingers Interlocked Special Edition (2001)
 California Red 903 Live in Concert (Video) (2001)
 EMI Best Music Collection (2002)
 Love & Dream (2003)
 I Am Chilam (2009)
 I AM CHILAM 2nd Version (2009)
 What is Love (2011)
 Like A Song (single) (2013)
 DEJA VU (2014)

Filmography

Television series

Film

Variety and reality show

Awards
 TVB Star Award Malaysia 2013 – My Favourite TVB Actor in a Leading Role – Triumph in the Skies 2
 TVB Star Award Malaysia 2013 – My Favourite Top 15 TVB Drama Characters – Triumph in the Skies 2
 StarHub TVB Awards 2013 : My Favourite TVB Male Character – Triumph in the Skies 2
 StarHub TVB Awards 2011: Best Couple on Screen – with Myolie Wu – The Rippling Blossom
 StarHub TVB Awards 2011: My Favorite Male Character – The Rippling Blossom
 Jade Solid Gold 2009 : Best Duet Award (Silver) with Myolie Wu
 Metro Radio Hits Music Awards 2009 － Best Duet with Myolie Wu
 Metro Radio Hits Music Awards 2009 – Best Karaoke Song – 你太善良
 粤港十年·网娱盛典颁奖晚会 2007 – 最具关注度男艺人 
 CTV's 7th Lily Awards: Most Popular Actor (2007)
 Astro Awards 2005: Best Couple with Charmaine Sheh from Point of No Return
 Astro Awards 2005: Best Character Award – Chow Tin Ci / Zhou Tian Ci from Point of No Return
 Astro Awards 2005: Best Theme Song – Love Has No Dreams from Point of No Return
 36th TVB Anniversary Awards: "My Top 12 Favorite Television Characters" – Yeung Kwong / Yang Guang from Take My Word For It (2003)
 Publication Weekly Television Awards: Most Popular Theme Song – Wishing Kwan Well from Return of the Cuckoo (2001)
 Publication Weekly Television Awards: Top 10 Television Artists – #9 (2001)
 Jade Solid Gold: Most Popular Adapted Song Performance Grand Prize – Wishing Kwan Well from Return of the Cuckoo (2001)
 Singapore's Friday Publication Weekly Student Idol Voting: Most Popular Foreign Film Actor (2000–2001)
 New City Station: Karaoke Song Grand Prize for Wishing Kwan Well from Return of the Cuckoo (2000)
 33rd TVB Anniversary Awards: "My Favorite On-screen Couple" with Charmaine Sheh from Return of the Cuckoo (2000)
 33rd TVB Anniversary Awards: "Top 10 My Favourite Television Characters' as Man Chor in Return of the Cuckoo (2000)
 One of the Top 10 Most Popular Artists of the Millennium (2000)
 3rd Jade Solid Gold: Top 10 Songs of the Year – Wishing Kwan Well from Return of the Cuckoo (2000)
 Singapore Yes93: Top 3 Golden Songs – You Mei You (有没有) Have it or Not (1999)
 Singapore's Friday Publication Weekly Student Idol Voting: Voted amongst the Top 10 Most Popular Actors, Top 10 Most Popular * Film Artists, Top 10 Most Popular Foreign Film Actors, and Top 10 Most Popular Foreign Television Actors (1998–1999)
 1st Annual Top 10 Movie Theme Songs Award: Lofty Once in a Lifetime from "To Be No. 1" (1997)
 Commercial Radio Chit Chat Pop Chart: Best New Male Singer – Silver Prize (1993)
 Hit Radio: Best New Male Singer Award (1993)
 TVB's Jade Solid Gold: Best Newcomer Award – Bronze (1992–1993)
 Metro Radio: Best Young Talent Award (1992)
 CRHK2 New Generation Show: Best Performance Award (1992)
 1991 Jade Solid Gold: Top 10 Songs of the Year (Modern Love Story, a duet with Maple Hui)

References

External links
 
 
 
 
 
 
 
 JayneStars.com – English translated news about Julian Cheung

1971 births
Living people
Alumni of Lingnan University (Hong Kong)
Cantonese people
Cantopop singers
Hong Kong emigrants to Australia
Hong Kong Buddhists
Hong Kong male film actors
20th-century Hong Kong male singers
Hong Kong Mandopop singer-songwriters
Hong Kong singer-songwriters
Hong Kong male television actors
Naturalised citizens of Australia
TVB veteran actors
20th-century Hong Kong male actors
21st-century Hong Kong male actors
21st-century Hong Kong male singers
Australian people of Chinese descent